Resin canals or resin ducts are elongated, tube-shaped intercellular spaces surrounded by epithelial cells which secrete resin into the canal. These canals are orientated longitudinally and radially in between fusiform rays. They are usually found in late wood: denser wood grown later in the season. Resin is antiseptic and aromatic and prevents the development of fungi and deters insects.

Types 
 Normal resin canals exist naturally in the wood of the genera Picea, Larix, Pinus, Pseudotsuga and Shorea.
 Traumatic resin canals may be formed in wounded trees that don't have normal resin canals. Wounding occurs from either fire, freezing or mechanical damage. These canals are irregularly shaped compared to normal resin canals.

Characteristics 
Resin canal characteristics (such as number, size and density) in pine species can determine its resistance to pests. In one study, biologists were able to categorize 84% of lodgepole pine, and 92% of limber pines, as being either susceptible or resistant to bark beetles based only on their resin canals and growth rate over 20 years. In another study, scientists found ponderosa pine trees that survived drought and bark beetle attacks had resin ducts that were >10% larger in diameter, >25% denser (resin canals per mm2), and composed >50% more area of per ring.

References

Further reading 
John G. Haygreen, Jim L. Bowyer: Forest products and wood sciences. Iowa State University Press, Ames, Iowa, 1996 (3rd ed.), 

Resins
Plant anatomy
Plant physiology
Cell biology
Wood